Cross-country skiing was one of the competitions at the 2022 Winter Paralympics in Beijing, China. In total, 20 medal events were held.

Medal summary

Medal table
The ranking in the table is based on information provided by the International Paralympic Committee (IPC) and will be consistent with IPC convention in its published medal tables. By default, the table will be ordered by the number of gold medals the athletes from a nation have won (in this context, a "nation" is an entity represented by a National Paralympic Committee). The number of silver medals is taken into consideration next and then the number of bronze medals. If nations are still tied, equal ranking is given and they are listed alphabetically by IPC country code.

Women's events

Men's events

Relay events

See also
Cross-country skiing at the 2022 Winter Olympics

References

External links
 2022 Winter Paralympics Qualification Regulations
 Results book 

 
2022 Winter Paralympics
2022 Winter Paralympics events
Paralympics
Cross-country skiing competitions in China